The Boyuk Bazar Mosque is a mosque in the city of Lankaran, Azerbaijan. By the order of the Cabinet of Ministers of the Republic of Azerbaijan dated 2 August 2001, the mosque was taken under the state protection as an architectural monument of history and culture of local significance (No. 4805).

Description 
The mosque was built in the early years of the 19th century and is currently the oldest mosque in the city. The walls of the mosque are built of red baked bricks, the roof is covered with ceramic tiles.

The mosque got its name thanks to its location - the place Boyuk Bazar (Big Bazaar) in the center of Lankaran. Until 1929, there were six takyas in the mosque. their names were taken on behalf of those who built them. Takya Karbalaya Hussein, General Mir Abbas Khan Talyshinsky, the Karimovs, Hadji Manaf and Hadji Alasgar were destroyed after the Soviet occupation in the 1930s. Takya Haji Hajiagi Akbarov remained unchanged. From the mosque in 1938-1980 used as a bread factory, in 1980-1990 there was a gallery.

The mosque consists of a main and auxiliary buildings, and one minaret. The original minaret of the mosque was destroyed by the Soviet regime, and in 1995 a new 36-meter minaret was built. The area of the mosque is 500 m², and 550 people can pray in the mosque at the same time.

Photos

See also 
 Kichik Bazar Mosque

References

Mosques in Lankaran